The Jeannette Jays was the predominant name of  a minor league baseball team located in Jeannette, Pennsylvania, between 1926 and 1937. The Jays first played in the Middle Atlantic League from 1926 until 1931. On May 23, 1931, The Jays with a 1-11 record, moved to Altoona, Pennsylvania, to become the short-lived Altoona Engineers. Then on July 18, 1931, the Engineers moved to nearby Beaver Falls to become the Beaver Falls Beavers.

After a three-year hiatus, the team played as the Jeannette Reds as an affiliate of the Cincinnati Reds in the Pennsylvania State Association. After a year off, they were known as the Jeannette Little Pirates, an affiliate of the Pittsburgh Pirates. The team was finally known as the Jeannette Bisons in 1937, before folding.

Notable alumni
Jess Cortazzo
Jim Curry
Rags Faircloth
Ken Heintzelman
Orville Jorgens
Jerry Lynn
Whitey Moore
Red Nonnenkamp
Jimmy Outlaw
Jimmy Ripple
Al Rubeling
Art Scharein
Phil Voyles
Bud Weiser
Kemp Wicker
Rusty Yarnall

Seasons

References

Baseball teams established in 1926
Baseball teams disestablished in 1937
Defunct minor league baseball teams
Cincinnati Reds minor league affiliates
Pittsburgh Pirates minor league affiliates
1926 establishments in Pennsylvania
1937 disestablishments in Pennsylvania
Defunct baseball teams in Pennsylvania
Middle Atlantic League teams
Westmoreland County, Pennsylvania